Blue River Township is one of thirteen townships in Henry County, Indiana, United States. As of the 2010 census, its population was 1,224 and it contained 500 housing units.

Blue River Township was organized in 1848.

Geography
The streams of Number Four Arm and Wilbur Wright Creek run through this township.

Cities and towns
 Mooreland

Unincorporated towns
 Messick
(This list is based on USGS data and may include former settlements.)

Adjacent townships
 Stoney Creek Township (north)
 Union Township, Randolph County (northeast)
 Dalton Township, Wayne County (east)
 Liberty Township (south)
 Prairie Township (west)

Cemeteries
The township contains one cemetery, Bales.

Major highways
  U.S. Route 36

References
 
 United States Census Bureau cartographic boundary files

External links
 Indiana Township Association
 United Township Association of Indiana

Townships in Henry County, Indiana
Townships in Indiana